521st may refer to:

521st Air Defense Group, disbanded United States Air Force organization
521st Air Mobility Operations Wing (521 AMOW), part of Air Mobility Command, stationed at Ramstein Air Base, Germany
521st Fighter-Bomber Squadron, inactive United States Air Force unit

See also
521 (number)
521, the year 521 (DXXI) of the Julian calendar
521 BC